The Canadian Teachers' Federation (CTF/FCE) is a bilingual not-for-profit organization and a national alliance of provincial and territorial teacher organizations representing more than 277,000 members throughout Canada. The CTF/FCE is affiliated with Education International.

Introduction 
The CTF/FCE advocates for various social justice and equity topics.

History 
Harry Charlesworth was the first president of the CTF/FCE, serving from 1920 to 1922.

Public activity 

In July 2018, at a two-day Canadian Forum on Public Education in Edmonton, the CTF/FCE director of research and professional learning spoke about the increase in classroom violence.

In 2014, the CTF/FCE created a work–life balance survey, engaging secondary and elementary teachers on issues of stress and imbalance, as well as possible ways to create improvements in this balance. The report brought forward several results, including the fact that many teachers felt a strong tension between work responsibilities, as well as duties and responsibilities outside of the work environment.

Members
 Alberta Teachers' Association
 Association des enseignantes et des enseignants franco-ontariens
 BC Teachers' Federation
 Syndicat des enseignantes et enseignants du programme francophone de la Colombie-Britannique (associate member)
 Elementary Teachers' Federation of Ontario
 Manitoba Teachers' Society
 New Brunswick Teachers' Association
 Newfoundland and Labrador Teachers' Association
 Northwest Territories Teachers' Association
 Nova Scotia Teachers Union
 Nunavut Teachers' Association
 Ontario English Catholic Teachers' Association
 Ontario Teachers' Federation (Associate Member)
 Prince Edward Island Teachers' Federation
 Quebec Provincial Association of Teachers
 Saskatchewan Teachers' Federation
 Yukon Teachers' Association
 Ontario Secondary School Teachers' Federation

References

External links

 

 
Trade unions established in 1920
Educational organizations based in Ontario
Education trade unions
1920 establishments in Canada
Trade unions in Canada